Macun District is a district of Henan, China. It is under the administration of the Jiaozuo city.

Administrative divisions
As 2012, this district is divided to 7 subdistricts.
Subdistricts

References

County-level divisions of Henan
Jiaozuo